Boris Jarak (born 19 April 1963) is a former Yugoslav/Croatian handball player who competed in the 1988 Summer Olympics.

In 1988 he was part of the Yugoslav team which won the bronze medal. He played two matches.
In 1995 he was part of the Croatian team which won the silver medal.

Honours
Dubrovnik
Croatian regional league - (South) (1): 1980-81

Medveščak
Yugoslav Cup (4): 1986, 1987, 1989, 1990

Zagreb
Croatian First A League (2): 1994–95, 1995–96
Croatian Cup (2): 1995, 1996

External links
profile

1963 births
Living people
Yugoslav male handball players
Croatian male handball players
Handball players at the 1988 Summer Olympics
Olympic handball players of Yugoslavia
Olympic bronze medalists for Yugoslavia
Olympic medalists in handball
Medalists at the 1988 Summer Olympics
RK Medveščak Zagreb players